Nuray is a feminine given name of Turkish origin meaning "bright moon." It is among the most popular names given to baby girls in Azerbaijan in 2007.

Given name
 Nuray Deliktaş (born 1971), Turkish female taekwondo coach and former practitioner 
 Nuray Hafiftaş (born 1964), Turkish folk singer
 Nuray Lale (born 1962), Turkish-German writer and translator
 Nuray Levent (born 2000), Turkish weightlifter
 Nuray Mert (born 1960), Turkish journalist

Notes

Turkish feminine given names